Yugoslav irredentism was a political idea advocating merging of South Slav-populated territories within Yugoslavia with several adjacent territories, including Bulgaria, Western Thrace and Greek Macedonia. The government of the Kingdom of Yugoslavia sought the union with Bulgaria or its incorporation into Yugoslavia. Since 1945, the Socialist Federal Republic of Yugoslavia under Josip Broz Tito sought to create an integral Yugoslavia that would incorporate within its borders: Greek Macedonia and Thrace, Albania, Bulgaria, portions or entire Austrian Carinthia, and for a time the entire Italian region of Friuli-Venezia Giulia.

History
Proponents of Yugoslav irredentism included both monarchists and republicans. Days prior to Yugoslavia's creation in 1918, Yugoslavist politician Svetozar Pribićević declared that Yugoslavia's borders should extend "from the Soča up to Salonika". Proposals in the interwar period to include Bulgaria within Yugoslavia, included claims by republicans that a republic was necessary for an Integral Yugoslavia with Bulgaria, while others claimed that a republic would not because Bulgaria at that time was a tsardom, and instead claimed that a limited constitutional monarchy would be an appropriate form of state that could include Bulgaria within it. The militant movement Zveno in Bulgaria supported an Integral Yugoslavia that included Bulgaria as well as Albania within it. The Zveno movement participated  in the Bulgarian coup d'état of 1934, the coup supporters declared their intention to immediately form an alliance with France and to seek the unification of Bulgaria into an Integral Yugoslavia.

Once World War II began, in 1940 General Milan Nedić proposed that Yugoslavia join the Axis Powers and attack Greece to seize Salonika. During World War II, the British government supported the creation of a Greater Yugoslavia after the war due to opposition to the Bulgarian government's accession to the Axis Powers, in May 1941 endorsing Dr. Malcom Burr's paper in favour of the incorporation of Bulgaria into Yugoslavia after the war.

After World War II, Tito declared that Yugoslavia had the right to have Trieste and all of Carinthia, including Austrian Carinthia, saying "We have liberated Carinthia but international conditions were such that we had to leave it temporarily. Carinthia is ours and we shall fight for it".

See also
Greater Serbia
Yugoslavism
Greater Croatia
Greater Bulgaria
Greater Romania
Greater Albania
Hungarian irredentism
Megali Idea
Greater Germany
Italian irredentism

References

Sources
 

History of Yugoslavia
Irredentism
Pan-Slavism
South Slavic history
Yugoslavism
Yugoslav unification